The Karl Landsteiner Memorial Award is a scientific award given by the American Association of Blood Banks (AABB) to scientists with "an international reputation in transfusion medicine or cellular therapies" "whose original research resulted in an important contribution to the body of scientific knowledge". Recipients give a lecture at the AABB Annual Meeting and receive a $7,500 honorarium. The prize was initiated in 1954 to honor Karl Landsteiner, whose research laid the foundation for modern blood transfusion therapy.

Recipients
 1954 Reuben Ottenberg
 1955 Richard Lewisohn
 1956 Philip Levine, Alexander Solomon Wiener
 1957 Ruth Sanger, Robert Russell Race
 1958 Oswald Hope Robertson, Francis Peyton Rous, J. R. Turner
 1959 Ernest Witebsky
 1960 Patrick L. Mollison
 1961 Robert R. A. Coombs
 1962 William C. Boyd
 1963 Fred H. Allen Jr., Louis K. Diamond
 1964 J. J. van Loghem
 1965 Ruggero Ceppellini
 1966 Elvin A. Kabat
 1967 Walter Morgan, Winifred Watkins
 1968 Rodney R. Porter
 1969 Vincent J. Freda, John G. Gorman, William Pollack
 1970 Jean Dausset
 1971 Bruce Chown, Marion Lewis
 1972 Richard E. Rosenfield
 1973 Arthur E. Mourant
 1974 Manfred M. Mayer, Hans J. Müller-Eberhard
 1975 Baruch S. Blumberg, Alfred M. Prince
 1976 Marie Cutbush Crookston, Eloise R. Giblett
 1977 Rose Payne, Jon van Rood
 1978 Fred Stratton
 1979 Nevin C. Hughes-Jones, Serafeim P. Masouredis
 1980 Donald M. Marcus, James M. Stavely
 1981 James F. Danielli, S. Jonathan Singer
 1982 Georges J. F. Köhler, César Milstein
 1983 Vincent T. Marchesi
 1984 Oliver Smithies
 1985 Saul Krugman
 1986 Claes F. Högman, Grant R. Bartlett
 1987 E. Donnall Thomas
 1988 Charles P. Salmon
 1989 George W. Bird
 1990 Robert Gallo, Luc Montagnier
 1991 Paul I. Terasaki
 1992 Harvey J. Alter, Daniel W. Bradley, Qui-Lim Choo, Michael Houghton, George Kuo, Lacy Overby
 1993 C. Paul Engelfriet
 1994 Kenneth Brinkhous, Harold Roberts, Robert Wagner, Robert Langdell
 1995 W. Laurence Marsh
 1996 Eugene Goldwasser
 1997 Wendell F. Rosse
 1998 Richard H. Aster, Scott Murphy, Sherrill J. Slichter
 1999 Kary B. Mullis
 2000 Michael E. DeBakey
 2001 John Bowman
 2002 Hal E. Broxmeyer
 2003 Victor A. McKusick
 2004 Tibor Greenwalt
 2005 Peter Agre
 2006 James D. Watson
 2007 Peter Issitt
 2008 Ernest Beutler
 2009 Curt I. Civin
 2010 Steven A. Rosenberg
 2011 David Weatherall, Yuet Wai Kan
 2012 Kenneth Kaushansky
 2013 Barry S. Coller
 2014 Carl June
 2015 Nancy C. Andrews
 2016 Stuart Orkin
 2017 Irving Weissman
 2018 David A. Williams
 2019 David Anstee, Jean-Pierre Cartron, Colvin Redman, Fumiichiro Yamamoto

See also
 List of medicine awards

References

Medicine awards
Awards established in 1954
Blood donation